Mason Filippi (born April 23, 1998) is an American auto racing driver who competes in the TCR class of the Michelin Pilot Challenge for Bryan Herta Autosport. He previously raced for Bryan Herta Autosport, finishing the Michelin Pilot Challenge in second place in 2019 and third in 2020. Filippi also piloted touring cars in the TC America Series and the Pirelli World Challenge from 2017 to 2019, finishing in the top five of the standings each season. Prior to racing touring cars, he drove Spec Miatas, competing in the Global MX-5 Cup and the Teen Mazda Challenge and winning the 25 Hours of Thunderhill race in 2015 and 2016.

Early life and education
 
Mason Filippi was born on April 23, 1998. He grew up in Alamo, California and attended high school at Berean Christian High School in nearby Walnut Creek. He studied at Diablo Valley College and Arizona State University.
 
He was gifted his first dirt bike at age 4, his first go-kart at age 11, and his first Mazda Miata at age 14. He earned his provisional license at age 15 after attending the Sports Car Club of America (SCCA) driver's school.

Career
 
After receiving his full competition license from the SCCA, Filippi began entering races in the San Francisco region (SFR) and was named the 2014 SCCA SFR Rookie of the Year. In 2015, he won the National Auto Sport Association's Teen Mazda Challenge West Coast title. His victory in that Spec Miata series led to his appearance as one of nine finalists in the 2015 Mazda Road to 24 Shootout. Later in 2015, Filippi was on the Grip Racing team that won the 25 Hours of Thunderhill race in the E1 class. In 2016, he and his team repeated as winners of that race in the E1 class.

Global MX-5 Cup
 
Filippi joined the Winding Road team for the 2016 season of the Global MX-5 Cup. He drove the number 2 car in the Spec Miata series, competing in six out of the twelve races and finishing in 34th place in the standings with 125 overall points. His best finish in a race was 14th place, which he achieved at both the WeatherTech Raceway Laguna Seca and Watkins Glen International.

Pirelli World Challenge/TC America Series
 
Filippi first entered the Pirelli World Challenge in 2016, racing in the final four events of the season in the TCA class for Atlanta Motorsports Group. He finished in the top ten in each of his races with his highest finish (fifth) coming at Laguna Seca. He placed 14th in the overall standings with 296 points for the 2016 season.
 
For the 2017 Pirelli World Challenge, Filippi joined Winding Road Team TFB and began competing in the TC class. He drove the number 12 BMW M235iR. That year, he competed in all twelve races, earning his first Pirelli World Challenge victory at Canadian Tire Motorsport Park in round four. He also achieved the fastest lap in that race. Including that event, Filippi finished in the top ten in nine races that season. He finished fifth in the overall standings with 173 points.
 
Filippi remained with Team TFB for the 2018 Pirelli World Challenge, and he also joined the TCR class racing in the number 12 Volkswagen Golf GTi TCR. In August 2018, however, Filippi announced that he would be joining RealTime Racing for the final four races of the season, opting to drive the number 44 Honda Civic Type R TCR. He had his best finishes of the season in that car, coming in third and second respectively at the final two races of the season at Watkins Glen. He finished fourth in the overall standings with 183 points.
 
For the 2019 season, the Pirelli World Challenge was rebranded as the TC America Series. Filippi returned to Team TFB at the beginning of the season, driving the number 12 Hyundai Veloster N TCR in the TCR class. At the season's first two races at the Circuit of the Americas in Austin, Texas, Filippi came in first, achieving the initial race's fastest lap, as well. Because of scheduling conflicts with the Michelin Pilot Challenge season, Filippi did not compete in the next four races on the TC America Series schedule. In May 2019, it was announced that he would return to the TC America Series as a member of the Copeland Motorsports team. He continued driving the Hyundai Veloster N TCR and went on to win four additional races that season. With 187 points, he finished third in the overall standings despite competing in only ten of the 16 races that year.

IMSA Michelin Pilot Challenge
 
In January 2019, it was announced that Filippi would join Bryan Herta Autosport (with Curb-Agajanian) to compete in the TCR class of the IMSA Michelin Pilot Challenge in the number 21 Hyundai Veloster N TCR with co-driver Harry Gottsacker. Both Filippi and Gottsacker were rookies on the series. The duo appeared in the top ten in each of the ten races that season and finished on the podium in three races, including first place at Road America in Elkhart Lake, Wisconsin. That victory came after the number 89 car, which finished ahead of Filippi, was disqualified for failing to give one of its drivers the minimum drive-time. Filippi and Gottsacker finished in second place in the overall standings with 268 points.
 
For the 2020 Michelin Pilot Challenge season, it was announced that Filippi would stay with Bryan Herta Autosport (with Curb-Agajanian) but would become Michael Lewis' co-driver in the number 98 Hyundai Veloster N TCR. The pair came in fourth in the season's first race at the Daytona International Speedway. The next race in the series was scheduled for March 2020, but was postponed due to the COVID-19 pandemic. In the meantime, Filippi competed in the IMSA iRacing Pro Series before the Michelin Pilot Challenge returned in July 2020. Filippi and Lewis secured two victories in the 2020 season, one at Virginia International Raceway and the other at Road Atlanta. They finished in third place overall with 273 points.
 
For the 2021 Michelin Pilot Challenge season, Filippi is part of the Hyundai USA/ Bryan Herta Autosport Team Driver to drive for Copeland Motorsports in the TCR class. He will drive the number 51 Hyundai Veloster N TCR with co-driver AJ Muss.

NASCAR
On May 25, 2022, DGM Racing announced that Filippi would make his Xfinity Series and NASCAR debut in the race at Portland in the team's No. 91 car. He was also scheduled to make his NASCAR Camping World Truck Series debut at Sonoma with G2G Racing however due to him not being able to learn the truck quick enough, he was switched out with Stefan Parsons. He would later make his debut at Mid-Ohio.

Racing record

Career summary

Complete 25 Hours of Thunderhill results

Complete Global MX-5 Cup results
(key) (Races in bold indicate pole position) (Races in italics indicate fastest lap)

Complete Pirelli World Challenge results
 
(key) (Races in bold indicate pole position) (Races in italics indicate fastest lap)

Complete TC America Series results
(key) (Races in bold indicate pole position) (Races in italics indicate fastest lap)

Complete WeatherTech SportsCar Championship results 
(key) (Races in bold indicate pole position; races in italics indicate fastest lap)

Complete Michelin Pilot Challenge results
(key) (Races in bold indicate pole position) (Races in italics indicate fastest lap)

NASCAR
(key) (Bold – Pole position awarded by qualifying time. Italics – Pole position earned by points standings or practice time. * – Most laps led.)

Xfinity Series

Camping World Truck Series

References

External links
 
 

American racing drivers
Living people
1998 births
People from Alamo, California
NASCAR drivers
FIA Motorsport Games drivers
Bryan Herta Autosport drivers
Michelin Pilot Challenge drivers
WeatherTech SportsCar Championship drivers
JDC Motorsports drivers